George Yates (6 June 1856 – 21 August 1925) was an English cricketer who represented Lancashire from 1885 to 1894

Yates was born in Haslingden, Lancashire. He played cricket for Werneth in 1880, and in 1881 was living with his wife Annie at the pavilion of Werneth Cricket Club, in Chamber Road, Oldham, Lancashire. He made his debut for Lancashire in July 1885 against Surrey when he made 10 runs in his only innings and took a catch. Yates was a right-hand batsman and played 135 innings in 92 first-class matches with an average of 13.60 and a top score of 74. He was a round arm right-arm fast bowler and took 30 first-class wickets at an average of 31.13 and a best performance of 4 for 112.

Yates died in Marple, Cheshire, at the age of 69.

References

1856 births
1925 deaths
Lancashire cricketers
English cricketers
People from Haslingden
Cricketers from Oldham